Nathanael (or Nathaniel) Salmon (22 March 1675 – 2 April 1742) was an English antiquary who wrote books on Roman and other antiquities to be found in the south-east of England. He was not well respected as a scholar in his time or subsequently, but he was industrious and well travelled, and he recorded many local customs and much folklore.

Early life
Nathanael Salmon was born on 22 March 1675 at Meppershall Rectory, Bedfordshire, the eldest son of Thomas Salmon, the Rector, and his wife Katherine Bradshaw. He was educated at Corpus Christi College, Cambridge (LLB, 1695).

Career
Salmon was ordained a priest in 1699, but refused to swear allegiance to Queen Anne in 1702 and thereby reject the son of King James II. He resigned as a curate and worked for a time as a physician. He rejected the offer of a parish in Suffolk, although it paid a stipend of £140 a year.

Salmon wrote a number of books on local history, collecting folklore and detailing local customs, and he "could turn a pungent phrase." He travelled extensively in England, carefully observing landscape and recording what he was told of the folklore, as well as current life and conditions. His histories are considered inaccurate, but he usefully published much manuscript material.

Death
Salmon died in London on 2 April 1742, leaving three daughters. He was buried at St Dunstan in the West, London 5 April 1742.

Works
The History of Hertfordshire, describing the county and its ancient monuments, particularly the Roman, Richardson, London, 1728.
A New Survey of England, wherein the Defects of Camden are supplied &c, 11 parts, 1728–1729.
The Lives of the English Bishops from the Restauration to the Revolution, 1731–1733.
Antiquities of Surrey, collected from the most ancient records, London, 1736.
The History and Antiquities of Essex, 1740.

See also
Henry Chauncy

References

Further reading

1675 births
1742 deaths
English antiquarians
18th-century English historians
18th-century English medical doctors
People from Central Bedfordshire District
Alumni of Corpus Christi College, Cambridge
English local historians
Historians of Christianity
Folklorists
History of Surrey
History of Essex
History of Hertfordshire
18th-century English clergy
18th-century English male writers
British historians of religion